Juice is a German online hip hop magazine and the biggest of its kind in Europe. It was a print publication between 1997 and November 2019. Then it began to be an online magazine. In every issue, readers find interviews with rappers and record reviews. The editors pick an 'album of the month' and, additional to the normal reviews, Juice features a 'battle of the ear': If the editorial staff's opinions about a record diverge strongly, it is reviewed by two different editors, each defending their point of view. In the magazine, records are rated with crowns on a scale from one to six.

Juice was published 11 times per year by Piranha Media until November 2019. In the first quarter of 2007, 28,757 copies were sold.

Other rubrics include the "All Time Classic", a two-page report about rappers or groups that have influenced hip hop culture or have released albums that are considered classics by today's standards. Featured artists include Tuff Crew, Coldcut, the WhoRidas, Newcleus, Kenny 'Dope' Gonzales, Hijack, X-Clan and K-Rino

Since 2005, both rappers and producers are asked to rate beats in a section called "...vs. the Beats". Featured performers are, among others: Amp Fiddler, Kano, the Saïan Supa Crew, St Laz New Industry Records, DJ Fade and Five Deez.

The magazine includes a sampler with 15 tracks, sometimes tracks only released on the Juice sampler.

Issues

References

External links
 Official website

1997 establishments in Germany
2019 disestablishments in Germany
Hip hop magazines
Magazines established in 1997
Magazines disestablished in 2019
Magazines published in Munich
Music magazines published in Germany
Monthly magazines published in Germany
Online music magazines published in Germany
Online magazines with defunct print editions